Clovelly Trails is a neighbourhood located in the northeast end of St. John's, Newfoundland and Labrador.

Clovelly Trails is a multi subdivision residential development; the area includes single-family homes, high-end homes and adult living complexes. Clovelly Trails is home to Clovelly Golf Course, the high-end homes in this area, that sell for around 3/4 of a million dollars, are located on the boundaries of the golf course. Most of the streets in the area are affiliated with war veterans.

The neighbourhood also consists of the Stavanger Drive commercial district, which was the first big-box store development in St. John's. Since being developed in the late 1990s, the area has undergone tremendous growth with such businesses as Boston Pizza, Costco(which is now closed and is now located at 75 Danny Dr, St. John's, NL A1H 1A3), Dominion Supermarket, BestBuy, Wal-Mart, Old Navy and McDonald's.

See also
Neighbourhoods in St. John's, Newfoundland and Labrador

Neighbourhoods in St. John's, Newfoundland and Labrador